The Perpetuities and Accumulations Act 1964 (13 Eliz. 2, c 55) is an Act of the Parliament of the United Kingdom. In English land law it reformed the rule against perpetuities.

See also
Perpetuities and Accumulations Act 2009

External links

United Kingdom Acts of Parliament 1964
English trusts law
Acts of the Parliament of the United Kingdom concerning England and Wales
1964 in England
1964 in Wales